Tessaracoccus lubricantis is a Gram-positive, non-spore-forming and non-motile  bacterium from the genus Tessaracoccus which has been isolate from metalworking fluid in Giessen, Germany.

References 

Propionibacteriales
Bacteria described in 2009